Condition is a 2011 science fiction film, directed by  Andrei Severny and produced by Amir Naderi. The film is a meditative psychological drama set in apocalyptic atmosphere. The story is a sensory battle of the two female characters: sound therapist Mary Taggert and her patient, a disturbed young woman named Alaska. The doctor evacuates with her patient, driving a car away from the city to unspecified northern territory towards the border. Having run out of gas, two women are stranded in mysterious rough and rocky wilderness close to the ocean where it becomes a battle for survival and a struggle with the inner wounds and salvation with sound and nature. The psychologically complex and slow narrative of Condition relies on sequences of abstract images that one could expect to see at a museum or gallery.

Condition features Antonella Lentini (Alaska), Jessica Kaye (Dr. Mary Taggert), Steve Moshier (fisherman). Three excerpts from the sonic compositions by Richard Garet can be heard in the film: Winter, Subtracted and For Shimpei Takeda. No musical instruments were used in any of the sounds heard in Condition.

The film premiered at the 29th Torino Film Festival and was recognized by the Gandhi Glasses award. The film was shot on location in New York City and the northern shoreline of Maine.

References

External links
 Official website
 Condition full film available on demand on Vimeo
 
 Condition on MUBI
 Andrei Severny Interview for Altera Magazine (Italy) following the premiere of Condition at Torino Film Festival

2011 films
2011 science fiction films
Films directed by Andrei Severny (filmmaker)
Films shot in Maine
Films shot in New York City
American science fiction films
2010s English-language films
2010s American films